Colloquialism, also called colloquial language, everyday language or general parlance, is the linguistic style used for casual (informal) communication. It is the most common functional style of speech, the idiom normally employed in conversation and other informal contexts. Colloquialism is characterized by wide usage of interjections and other expressive devices; it makes use of non-specialist terminology, and has a rapidly changing lexicon. It can also be distinguished by its usage of formulations with incomplete logical and syntactic ordering.

A specific instance of such language is termed a colloquialism. The most common term used in dictionaries to label such an expression is colloquial.

Explanation
Colloquialism or general parlance is distinct from formal speech or formal writing. It is the form of language that speakers typically use when they are relaxed and not especially self-conscious. An expression is labeled colloq. for "colloquial" in dictionaries when a different expression is preferred in formal usage, but this does not mean that the colloquial expression is necessarily slang or non-standard.

Some colloquial language contains a great deal of slang, but some contains no slang at all. Slang is often used in colloquial speech, but this particular register is restricted to particular in-groups, and it is not a necessary element of colloquialism. Other examples of colloquial usage in English include contractions or profanity.

"Colloquial" should also be distinguished from "non-standard". The difference between standard and non-standard is not necessarily connected to the difference between formal and colloquial. Formal, colloquial, and vulgar language are more a matter of stylistic variation and diction, rather than of the standard and non-standard dichotomy. The term "colloquial" is also equated with "non-standard" at times, in certain contexts and terminological conventions.

A colloquial name or familiar name is a name or term commonly used to identify a person or thing in non-specialist language, in place of another usually more formal or technical name. (See also: common name, trivial name).

In the philosophy of language, "colloquial language" is ordinary natural language, as distinct from specialized forms used in logic or other areas of philosophy. In the field of logical atomism, meaning is evaluated in a different way than with more formal propositions.

Distinction from other styles 
Colloquialisms are distinct from slang or jargon. Slang refers to words used only by specific social groups, such as demographics based on region, age, or socio-economic identity. In contrast, jargon is most commonly used within specific occupations, industries, activities, or areas of interest. Colloquial language includes slang, along with abbreviations, contractions, idioms, turns-of-phrase, and other informal words and phrases known to most native speakers of a language or dialect.

Jargon is terminology that is explicitly defined in relationship to a specific activity, profession, or group. The term refers to the language used by people who work in a particular area or who have a common interest. Similar to slang, it is shorthand used to express ideas, people, and things that are frequently discussed between members of a group. Unlike slang, it is often developed deliberately. While a standard term may be given a more precise or unique usage amongst practitioners of relevant disciplines, it is often reported that jargon is a barrier to communication for those people unfamiliar with the respective field.

See also
 Eye dialect
 Oral history
 Slang dictionary
 Vernacular

References

External links 

 Colloquial Spanish – Dictionary of Colloquial Spanish.
Tractatus Logico-Philosophicus, Ludwig Wittgenstein (archived 17 May 1997)

Language varieties and styles